Wilson Mutebi was an Anglican bishop he was the second Bishop of Mityana, serving from 1989 to 2002.

Mutebi  was born in 1937. He was educated at Uganda Christian University and ordained in 1972. He served in the Dioceses of Namirembe and Kampala.

References

21st-century Anglican bishops in Uganda
20th-century Anglican bishops in Uganda
Anglican bishops of Mityana
1937 births
Uganda Christian University alumni
Living people